The 2022–23 Ole Miss Rebels men's basketball team represented the University of Mississippi during the 2022–23 NCAA Division I men's basketball season. The Rebels were be led by fifth-year head coach, Kermit Davis, until his dismissal on February 24. The Rebels played their home games at The Sandy and John Black Pavilion at Ole Miss in Oxford, Mississippi as members of the Southeastern Conference.

Previous season
The Rebels finished the 2021–22 season 13–19, 4–14 in SEC play to finish in 13th place. They lost in the first round of the SEC tournament to Missouri.

Offseason

Departures

2022 recruiting class

Incoming transfers

Roster

Schedule and results

|-
!colspan=9 style=""| Exhibition

|-
!colspan=12 style=""| Non-conference regular season

|-
!colspan=12 style=""| SEC regular season

|-
!colspan=12 style=""| SEC tournament

See also
2022–23 Ole Miss Rebels women's basketball team

References 

Ole Miss
Ole Miss Rebels men's basketball seasons
Ole Miss Rebels men's basketball
Ole Miss Rebels men's basketball